Kil Yong-woo (born December 17, 1955) is a South Korean actor.

In 2010, he played one of the main characters in the stage adaptation of the bestselling novel Please Look After Mom.

Filmography

Film

Television series

Web series

Variety/radio show

Theater

Other activities
Besides acting, Kil is also a full-time faculty member of Jangan University's Department of Entertainment, an adjunct professor at Kyungpook National University, and an adjunct professor at Kaya University.

Ambassadorship 
 Ambassador of Public Relations to Seoul (2023)

Awards and nominations

References

External links
 Gil Yong-woo at Hunus Creative 
 
 
 

1955 births
Living people
South Korean male television actors
South Korean male film actors
South Korean male stage actors
Seoul Institute of the Arts alumni
Haepyeong Gil clan